Vriesland may refer to:

People
Victor E. van Vriesland (1892–1974), Dutch writer

Places

Guyana 
 Vriesland, Guyana, a village in Guyana

Netherlands 
 Friesland, an old spelling of the Dutch province.

United States 
 Vriesland, Michigan, a community in Michigan